A grass court is one of the four different types of tennis court on which the sport of tennis, originally known as "lawn tennis", is played. Grass courts are made of grasses in different compositions depending on the tournament. 

Although grass courts are more traditional than other types of tennis courts, maintenance costs of grass courts are higher than those of hard courts and clay courts. Grass courts (in the absence of suitable covers) must be left for the day if rain appears, as the grass becomes very slippery when wet and will not dry for many hours. This is a disadvantage on outdoor courts compared to using hard and clay surfaces, where play can resume in 30 to 120 minutes after the end of rain.

Grass courts are most common in the United Kingdom and Australia, although the Northeastern United States also has some private grass courts.

Play style
Because grass courts tend to be slippery, the ball often skids and bounces low while retaining most of its speed, rarely rising above knee height. In addition, there are often bad bounces. As a result, players must reach the ball faster relative to other surfaces, and rallies are likely to be comparatively brief; therefore, speed and power are rewarded on grass. On grass, the serve and return play a major part in determining the outcome of the point, increasing the importance of serving effectively, and maintaining focus in exchanges which can be heavily influenced by lapses in concentration. A grass court favours a serve and volley style of play.

Players

The most successful singles players on grass in the Open Era have been Martina Navratilova, Roger Federer, Margaret Court, Billie Jean King, Pete Sampras, Steffi Graf, Serena Williams, Novak Djokovic, Rod Laver, John Newcombe, Evonne Goolagong Cawley, Björn Borg, Chris Evert, and Venus Williams. All have won at least five major singles titles on grass: Navratilova won twelve, Federer and Court eight each, King, Sampras, Graf, Serena Williams, and Djokovic seven each. Other players who have been relatively successful on grass during the Open Era are Arthur Ashe, Ken Rosewall, Boris Becker, John McEnroe, Stefan Edberg, Virginia Wade, Rafael Nadal, Petra Kvitová and Andy Murray.

Among men, Sampras is lauded by many tennis analysts as one of the greatest grass-court players of all time. He won seven Wimbledon singles titles in eight years from 1993 through 2000, with his only loss in that span coming in the 1996 quarterfinals. Roger Federer is statistically the most successful male grass court player of the Open Era: he has won an Open Era-record 19 grass court titles, including ten Halle Open titles, an all-time record eight Wimbledon singles titles, and a Stuttgart Open title. Federer has contested an all-time record twelve Wimbledon singles finals, and has the longest grass court winning streak in the Open Era, when he won 65 consecutive matches on grass between 2003 and 2008, until he was beaten by Rafael Nadal in the 2008 Wimbledon final.

The most successful active female grass-court players are the sisters Serena Williams and Venus Williams, with seven and five Wimbledon singles titles respectively. Venus has won five out of her nine Wimbledon finals appearances (losing three to Serena), and the pair have won six titles in the ladies' doubles together.

Professional tournaments played on grass
The professional grass court season is comparatively short. Until 2014 it consisted only of Wimbledon, two weeks of tournaments in Britain and continental Europe leading up to it, and the Hall of Fame Tennis Championships in the Newport, Rhode Island, United States the week after. In 2015 it was extended, with an extra week between the French Open and Wimbledon. On the ATP Tour, the Stuttgart Open became a grass court tournament that year. In 2017 a new ATP 250 tournament in Antalya, Turkey, was played a week before Wimbledon. On the WTA Tour Mallorca, Spain, began hosting a grass court tournament beginning in 2016.

Summer grass season

See also

 Clay court
 Hardcourt
 Carpet court

References

External links
LTA – Grass Court Guidance

Tennis court surfaces

Grass field surfaces